Corybas despectans, commonly known as the tiny helmet orchid or sandhill helmet orchid is a species of terrestrial orchid endemic to southern Australia. It has round or heart-shaped leaf and a tiny reddish purple flower. Unlike many others in the genus, the dorsal sepal does not cover the labellum. It is similar to C. incurvus but the flowers are smaller.

Description 
The leaf is green on the upper surface and silvery green on the lower side. Flowering occurs from June to September.

Taxonomy 
Corybas despectans was first formally described in 1976 by David Jones and R.C. Nash from a specimen collected near Warooka and the description was published in Muelleria. The specific epithet (despectans) is a Latin word meaning "look down upon".

In 2002, David Jones and Mark Clements proposed splitting Corybas into smaller genera and placing this species into Corysanthes but the change has not been widely accepted.

Distribution and habitat 
The tiny helmet orchid forms colonies in forests and scrubland and is very common in some places. It occurs disjunctly in western Victoria and on the Mornington Peninsula, in the south-east of South Australia including Kangaroo Island and in Western Australia between Bunbury and Israelite Bay.

References 

despectans
Endemic orchids of Australia
Orchids of South Australia
Orchids of Western Australia
Orchids of Victoria (Australia)
Plants described in 1976